The Central District of Arzuiyeh County is a district (bakhsh) in Arzuiyeh County, Kerman Province, Iran. At the 2006 census, its population was 30,637, in 7,028 families.  The district has one city: Arzuiyeh.  The district has three rural districts (dehestan): Arzuiyeh Rural District, Dehsard Rural District, and Vakilabad Rural District.

References 

Arzuiyeh County
Districts of Kerman Province